The Marqués government was the regional government of Asturias led by President Sergio Marqués. It was formed in July 1995 after the regional election, becoming the first time that the Asturian Socialist Federation did not take the helm of the Council of Government.

In 1998, after several differences with members of the People's Party of Asturias, Marqués left the party and created his own one: the Asturian Renewal Union and remained in the government until 1999, despite a motion of no confidence.

Investiture

Composition

References

Cabinets of Asturias
Cabinets established in 1995